Vindyagiri is one of the two hills in Shravanabelagola in the Indian state of Karnataka. The other one being Chandragiri.

History
Vindhyagiri is first referred to as "Per kavappu" (Large - Kalbappu) in 8th Century, but its history begins with that of Gommateshwara in the Late 10th century. A century and half later the town is named Gommatapura, after the colossus, but the hill itself is not identified with a distinctive name. The present name "Vindhyagiri" is said to be derived from vim, spirit and dhya, meditation, as being the spot consecrated by rishis observed in the meditation on the supreme spirit.

Geography
The hill is located about 3,288 Feet from Mean sea Level and 438 Feet above the ground.

Importance 

The colossus of Bahubali at the summit dominates the valley. Jain mythology informs us that the first colossus of Bahubali was installed by Bharata at Paudanapura, it is described to be about 525 spans (Maru - about a meter) high. The 58' 8" high Bahubali image on the Large Hill with 438' high granite mass forming its pedestal.

In 981 A.D., Chavundaraya, a Ganga minister converted a tor standing at the summit into a colossus. Choosing a strategic opening between boulders, he also constructed a gateway (the present Akhanda Bagilu) with a large Gajalakshmi panel adorning its upper portion.

Odegal basadi is the largest basadi on Vindhyagiri hill. The temple derives the name from 'Odega', i.e., soapstone used for strengthening the walls of the temple. The temple houses image of Rishabhanatha, Neminatha and Shantinatha.

See also

Shravanbelgola
Jainism in Karnataka
Jainism in North Karnataka
Jain Bunt

Notes

References

External links
 Vindhyagiri Hill

Jain temples in Karnataka
Hills of Karnataka
Geography of Hassan district